Guerra is a surname.

Guerra (war in Spanish, Portuguese and Italian) may also refer to:

Places 
 Donato Guerra, State of Mexico, a municipality in Mexico
 Guerra, Texas
 Juan Guerra District, district of the province San Martín in Peru
 San Antonio de Guerra, a municipality (municipio) of the Santo Domingo province in the Dominican Republic
 Vargas Guerra District, district of the province Ucayali in Peru

Buildings 
 Casa de la Guerra, residence of the fifth commandant of the Presidio de Santa Barbara, José de la Guerra y Noriega from 1828 until his death in 1858
 Nazare Guerra School, school in the Itatira, Ceará, Brazil
 Paseo de la Guerra, complex of historic buildings in downtown Santa Barbara, California

Military 
 Croce di Guerra
 Ifni War (Guerra Ignorada)
 Reform War (Guerra de Reforma)
 Uruguayan Civil War (Guerra Grande)
 Guerra a muerte, term used in Chilean historiography to describe the irregular, no-quarter warfare that broke out from 1819 to 1821 during the Chilean War of Independence.
 Guerra, a type of corvette used by the Spanish

Entertainment 
 A guerra dos mascates, a novel written by the Brazilian writer José de Alencar
 Guerra de la Paz, composite name of Cuban born, American artist duo Alain Guerra (born 1968) and Neraldo de la Paz
 Guerra de Titanes, a major annual professional wrestling event in Mexico promoted by the Asistencia Asesoría y Administración (AAA) promotion.
 La guerra gaucha (novel)
 La Guerra Gaucha,  1942 Argentine historical drama and epic film

Music 
 Dalla guerra amorosa (HWV 102), a dramatic secular cantata for either bass (HWV 102a) or soprano (HWV 102b) written by Georg Frideric Handel
 Declare Guerra, the fourth album by Brazilian rock band Barão Vermelho
 Depois da Guerra, the tenth album by Oficina G3
 Guerra Gaucha, the eighth album of Enanitos Verdes published in 1996.
 Guerra de Estados Pesados, compilation album, which compiles music from performers from six different states of Mexico
 "La Guerra" (song)

Sport
 Guerra (cycling team)